Hau is a notion made popular by the French anthropologist Marcel Mauss in his 1925 book The Gift. Surveying the practice of gifting, he came to the conclusion that it involved belief in a force binding the receiver and giver. The term 'Hau', used by Māori, became a paradigmatic example for such a view. Writing at the turn of the century, Mauss relied on limited sources but his analysis has been expanded and refined.

See also
 Gift economy
 HAU: Journal of Ethnographic Theory

References

Mythology
Anthropology